Dendropsophus tintinnabulum is a species of frog in the family Hylidae. It is endemic to Brazil and only known from its type locality along the Uaupés River, "some days' journey north of Ipanoré", in the Amazonas state.

Description
Dendropsophus tintinnabulum is a small but sturdy frog. Three males in the type series measured  in snout–vent length (females were not collected). The eye is large and prominent. The tympanum is indistinct. The canthus rostralis is blunt. Fingers are almost one-fourth webbed, whereas the toes (which are orange) are two-thirds webbed. Discs are small. The dorsum is grayish green and the venter is bluish green.

The male advertisement call has a brittle, bell-like sound.

Habitat and conservation
These frogs probably live in the understory vegetation of tropical rainforest. The type collection was made by a small side river where many individuals were sitting on tall grasses and Melastomataceae bushes and calling. Threats to this little known species are unknown.

References

tintinnabulum
Amphibians of Brazil
Endemic fauna of Brazil
Amphibians described in 1941
Taxonomy articles created by Polbot